Cervical cancer screening is a medical screening test designed to identify abnormal, potentially precancerous cells within the cervix as well as cells that have progressed to early stages of cervical cancer. One goal of cervical screening is to allow for intervention and treatment so the abnormal lesions can be removed prior to progression to cancer. An additional goal is to decrease mortality from cervical cancer by identifying cancerous lesions in their early stages and providing treatment prior to progression to more invasive disease.

Currently available screening tests fall into three categories: molecular, cytologic and visual inspection. Molecular screening tests includes nucleic acid amplification tests (NAAT), which identify high risk human-papilomma virus (HPV) strains. Cytologic tests include conventional Pap smear and liquid based cytology. Visual Inspection tests involve application of a solution to enhance identification of abnormal areas and can utilize the naked eye or a colposcope/magnifying camera.

Medical organizations of different countries have unique guidelines and screening recommendations. The World Health Organization has also published guidelines to increase screening and improve outcomes for all women taking into consideration differences in resource availability of regions. Management of abnormal screening results can include surveillance, biopsy, or removal of the suspicious region via surgical intervention. Diagnosis of more advanced cancer stages may require other treatment options such as chemotherapy or radiation.

General Screening Procedure 

The procedures for testing women using Pap smear, liquid-based cytology, or HPV testing are similar. A sample of cells is collected from the cervix using a spatula or small brush. The cells are then checked for any abnormalities.

To take the sample of cells, the health care clinician inserts an instrument, called a speculum, inside the vagina. The speculum has two arms that spread the walls of the vagina apart in order to see the cervix. Then, they scrape the surface of the cervix with a spatula or small brush. This collects a sample of cells from the outer layer of the cervix.

Self-collection is also an option when testing by a provider is unavailable or uncomfortable for a patient. When utilizing HPV testing, self-collection has been shown to be as accurate as swabbing by a provider. This equality has not been demonstrated for other testing such as pap smear or liquid-based cytology.

With a Pap smear, cells collected using a spatula are smeared onto a slide for examination under a microscope. In liquid-based cytology, a sample of cells is taken using a small brush. The cells are put into a container of liquid, and analysed for abnormalities. Cervical cells to be tested for HPV are collected in a similar way.

Types of Screening

Molecular 
Molecular testing identifies an infection called human papillomavirus, or HPV. Human papillomavirus (HPV) infection is a cause of nearly all cases of cervical cancer. Most women will successfully clear HPV infections within 18 months. Those that have a prolonged infection with a high-risk type (e.g. types 16, 18, 31, 45) are more likely to develop Cervical Intraepithelial Neoplasia, due to the effects that HPV has on DNA.

The screening process utilizes nucleic acid amplification testing to look for DNA or RNA of the virus present within cervical cells. Some tests can identify up to 14 different types of high risk strains.

Accuracy of HPV testing report:

 sensitivity 88% to 91% (for detecting CIN 3 or higher) to 97% (for detecting CIN2+)
 specificity 73% to 79% (for detecting CIN 3 or higher) to 93% (for detecting CIN2+)

Cytologic

Conventional Pap smear 

In the conventional Pap smear, the collected cells are smeared on a microscope slide, and a fixative is applied. The slide is evaluated in a pathology lab to identify cellular abnormalities.

Accuracy of conventional cytology report:

 sensitivity: 55% to 88%
 specificity: 71% to 94%

Liquid-based monolayer cytology 

In liquid based monolayer cytology, the collected cells are placed into a liquid medium. The sample is evaluated in a pathology lab to evaluate cellular abnormalities.

Accuracy of liquid based monolayer cytology report:

 sensitivity 57% to 90%
 specificity 64% to 97%

Visual Inspection 
Visual inspection involves the application of ascetic acid or lugol's iodine solution to the cervix. These solutions highlight abnormal areas for easier identification with the naked eye. A magnifying camera called a colposcope can also be utilized for clearer viewing when available.

Combination testing (Co-testing) 
Combination testing or co-testing, is when individuals receive both molecular high risk HPV testing and cytology. These results can be utilized to calculate the patient's immediate risk for cervical intraepithelial neoplasia grade 3 or cancer (CIN3+).

The calculated risk can be used to recommend appropriate follow up options.

Recommendations 
Different countries and medical organizations have specific cervical screening recommendations to guide patient care.

World Health Organization 
In 2021 the World Health Organization published the second edition of WHO guideline for screening and treatment of cervical pre-cancer lesions for cervical cancer prevention. Within this publication they outline 23 recommendations addressing differences in guidelines for women living with or without HIV. The quality of evidence is rated strong, moderate, low or very low. Some of the recommendations are included below, this is not a comprehensive list.

 HPV molecular testing recommended as primary screening, with or without triage, in all women. HPV screening should occur every 5 to 10 years.
 When used, VIA or cytologic screening should occur every 3 years.
 Begin screening at the age of 30
 Stop screening at the age of 50, as long as most recent two tests were negative

Europe 
Most countries suggest or offer screening between the ages of 25 to 64. According to the 2015 European guidelines for cervical cancer screening, routine HPV primary screening should not begin under 30 years of age. Primary testing for oncogenic HPV can be used in a population-based programme for cervical cancer screening. In England, the NHS cervical screening programme is available to women aged 25 to 64; women aged 25 to 49 receive an invitation every 3 years and women aged 50 to 64 receive an invitation every 5 years to undergo HPV testing. If there is a positive HPV test result, then patients undergo further cytology (Pap smear).

United States 
Screening is recommended for women between ages 21–65, regardless of age at sexual initiation or other high-risk behaviors. For healthy women aged 21–29 who have never had an abnormal Pap smear, cervical cancer screening with cervical cytology (Pap smear) should occur every 3 years, regardless of HPV vaccination status. The preferred screening for women aged 30–65 is "co-testing", which includes a combination of cervical cytology screening and HPV testing, every 5 years. However, it is acceptable to screen this age group with a Pap smear alone every 3 years or with an FDA-approved primary high risk HPV test every 5 years. In women over the age of 65, screening for cervical cancer may be discontinued in the absence of abnormal screening results within the prior 10 years and no history of high-grade lesions. Management of screening results is based on recommendations by the American College of Obstetricians and Gynecologists and other professional organizations.

Australia 
Screening is offered to women aged 18–70, every two years.  This is by Pap smear, and regardless of sexual history. In Canada, where screening programmes are arranged at provincial level, the general recommendation is not to begin routine screening until the age of 25 in the absence of specific reasons to, then to screen every three years until the age of 69. In Ontario, "The Ontario Cervical Screening Program recommends that women who are or have been sexually active have a Pap test every 3 years starting at age 21."

Thailand 
The Ministry of Public Health recommends women from age 30-60 receive primary HPV testing every 5 years. Based on the results of the test, those with higher risk strains of HPV will be referred for colposcopy, while those with lower risk strains will be referred for cytology.

Management of Screening Results 
Screening results are generally categorized as normal or abnormal. Women who receive an abnormal test result will be guided on their next recommended steps by their healthcare provider. Management is significantly impacted based on the type of testing done, and the severity of the abnormality. Some of the follow up options include surveillance, histological diagnosis via colposcopy/biopsy, or removal of the abnormal tissue via an ablative or surgical method.

The World Health Organization outlines two different approaches to cervical screening and follow up. They are the Screen and Treat; and the Screen, Triage and Treat. Patient preferences, healthcare access and system resources are factors that play a role in which approach providers will recommend to their patients.

Laser ablation and cryotherapy treat just the part of the cervix that contains abnormal cells. Laser ablation uses a laser to burn away the abnormal cells, while cryotherapy uses a cold probe to freeze the cells away. These procedures allow normal cells to grow back in their place. The loop electrical excision procedure (called LLETZ or 'large loop excision of the transformation zone' in the UK), cervical conization (or cone biopsy) and hysterectomy remove the whole area containing the abnormal cells.

Emerging technologies 

The Bill and Melinda Gates Foundation has funded an eight-year study of a DNA test for the virus that causes cervical cancer. The test manufactured by Qiagen for a low cost per test with results available in only a few hours may allow reduction in use of annual Pap smears. The test has been shown to work "acceptably well" on women who take the swabs themselves rather than allowing a physician to test. This may improve the chances of early diagnosis for women who are unwilling to be screened due to discomfort or modesty.

VIA, one of the alternative approaches to conventional testing, has shown to have a low specificity compared to cytology and a high rate of false positives in several studies. Entities such as inflammation, cervical condyloma and leukoplakia can give false positive results of VIA test. There is no permanent record of the test to be reviewed later. Between community centers high variability has been observed, and even in a study of Nigeria of 2013  VIA was not reproducible nor sensitive; this led to discouraging the method in that country.

In addition, p16/Ki-67 are emerging biomarkers that have been used as a triage method for HPV-positive patients. In studies conducted so far, p16/Ki-67 dual staining had a higher sensitivity and specificity compared to cytology. Using these biomarkers may help in reducing the number of false-positive tests and unnecessary examinations.

Assessing DNA methylation patterns in individuals with HPV is also an emerging screening method. There are about 80 methylation patterns that can serve as potential biomarkers for cervical cancer. Molecular testing of DNA methylation patterns is more objective than cytology testing and can be automated, requiring less training with more precision.

See also 
 CervicalCheck

References 

Cancer screening
Gynaecological cancer
Papillomavirus-associated diseases
Infectious causes of cancer